Broadwater Energy was a Liquefied Natural Gas Terminal proposed to be built in Long Island Sound between New York State and Connecticut. The project received vociferous objections from Connecticut officials and some New York state officials.

New York state officials had yet to decide whether to issue permits for the project as of March 2008, and Governor David Paterson said he might postpone a decision, originally scheduled to be made in April 2008 on whether to support the terminal. The terminal received federal approval from the Federal Energy Regulatory Commission on March 21, 2008, but energy analysts have said that state rather than regulators generally have the decisive role in deciding whether liquefied natural gas terminals may be built.

It is to be operated by Broadwater Energy L.L.C., a joint venture by TransCanada Corporation and Shell Oil for the transfer of liquefied natural gas from ships to pipelines. After being unloaded, the liquefied gas would be warmed back into a gas and pumped through pipelines (with the specific pipeline on the bottom of the sound called the "Iroquois Gas Transmission." The company calls the term a "Floating Storage Regasification Unit," or FSRU. It is expected  of natural gas per day into the pipeline.

It would have the capability to stockpile eight billion cubic feet of gas.

Broadwater's website notes advantages to consumers of cutting the cost of natural gas, cleaner fuel than oil, and the lack requirements to build onshore.

The State of New York which has territorial jurisdiction over the sound will have ultimate decisions on whether it will permit the project.  Broadwater says on its website the project if built on plan between 2009 and 2010 would cost $20 million directly.

Opposition
The project, which will be located off the coast of expensive residential property on eastern Long Island and eastern Connecticut, has stirred considerable local opposition including New York Senators, Charles E. Schumer and Hillary Clinton, and Representative Tim Bishop.  Clinton said:

I, like many Long Islanders, remain concerned that the security risks and environmental threats posed by the project have not been properly addressed. I also share the view held by many Long Islanders that this project would have detrimental impacts on the quality of water and air surrounding the sound.

Among the controversiesis concern that legislation may pass that would permit the Federal Energy Regulatory Commission to override local opposition.

New York Governor Eliot Spitzer, who resigned from office in March 2008 and was replaced by David Paterson, took no position on the project but raised eyebrows in November 2007 when he hired Bruce Gyory, a Broadwater lobbyist, to advise the governor.

Decision
On April 10, 2008, Governor Paterson rejects the Broadwater plan, stating at a Press Conference at Sunken Meadow State Park that it "Is not what Long Island Sound needs." Broadwater however does have the right to appeal to the US Department of Commerce.

Timeline
 January 2008 — Staff of the Federal Energy Regulatory Commission concludes the project will have only limited environmental impact.
 January 10, 2008 — U.S. General Accounting Office released a report on the U.S. Coast Guard's ability to provide security for the terminals and involved ships.
 January 16, 2008 — Connecticut Governor M. Jodi Rell writes to New York Governor Spitzer that the plant would hurt the Sound.
 March 20, 2008 — Federal Energy Regulatory Commission votes 5-0 to approve the project.
 April 10, 2008 — New York Governor David Paterson officially rejects the Broadwater plan altogether.

References

External links
Broadwaterenergy.com
Anti-Broadwater Coalition
Fraudwater.com
Article about the Broadwater proposal in the Hartford Advocate

Long Island Sound
Proposed liquefied natural gas terminals
Natural gas infrastructure in the United States
Joint ventures
Shell plc buildings and structures
TC Energy